The Pocket is a locality in New South Wales, Australia. It is a village surrounded by foothills. There is a local tennis court and school. The Pocket is subject to flooding because of its placement in a catchment and the series of creeks which flows through the area.

Climate 
The Pocket has mild climate with few frosts in winter and wet winters.

Name 
The Pocket is so named because of the village's placement between the hills. Some hills around The Pocket are as high as 400m.  To the west of The Pocket are the Mount Jerusalem ranges which climb to around 700m.

Notes and references

Northern Rivers